The Studio 440 was a sampler, sequencer, and 32 sound drum machine manufactured by Dave Smith's Sequential Circuits (SCI) and released in 1986.  The sampler's core is similar to that of the Prophet 2000 and Prophet 2002. There is a 3.5" floppy disk drive to  store samples and data.

Sample rate
The 440 also made it easier to access the full 768 KB of memory available, to create 12-bit samples from 12.5 to 33.5 seconds and up to 41.667 kHz.

 15.625 kHz rate : 33.5 seconds  —  6 kHz bandwidth 
 31.250 kHz rate : 16.7 seconds  —  12 kHz bandwidth 
 41.667 kHz rate : 12.5 seconds  —  18 kHz bandwidth

Sequencer
 8 tracks
 40,000 note capacity
 999 measures per sequence
 99 sequences 
 Two discrete MIDI outs with up to 32 channels of MIDI

Notable users
 Aphex Twin
 The Beatmasters
 Dan the Automator
 Simon Harris
 King Tech
 Mantronix
 The Orb
 Prince Paul
 Three Times Dope

References

Further reading

Sequential Circuits synthesizers
Samplers (musical instrument)
MIDI instruments
Digital synthesizers
Polyphonic synthesizers